Salem Cricket Foundation Stadium is a cricket stadium located in Salem district of Tamil Nadu, India. It was established in 2020 by Salem Cricket Foundation with assistance from Salem District Cricket Association and Tamil Nadu Cricket Association. It is the biggest cricket ground in the state in respect to play area. Chennai Super Kings started its Super Kings Academy in this stadium. 

The stadium has five pitches, 12 practice-turf wickets, players pavilion and press box. It is also built with a drainage system which refills ground water periodically. The seating capacity is 5000 which can be increased to up to 25,000 during big events.

As of February 2020, construction of stands for audience and parking facilities were planned by the Salem Cricket Foundation and Tamil Nadu Cricket Association. The stadium is expected to host Ranji Trophy, Tamil Nadu Premier League and Indian Premier League matches as per the officials.

Tournaments 
Salem Cricket Foundation Stadium hosted Tamil Nadu Premier League 2022. 7 league matches and 2 playoffs (qualifier 1 and eliminator) are held in this Stadium.

Stadium is also to host Duleep Trophy 2022 along with Chennai and Coimbatore. This stadium to host Semi-finals.

Location 
The stadium is located in Kattuveppilaipatti village, near Vazhapadi with Shevaroy hills in the backdrop. It is off the Chennai-Salem highway and nearly 25 km from Salem city.

Inauguration 
On 10 February 2020 after two years of construction, the stadium was inaugurated in the presence of Chief Minister Edappadi K. Palaniswami, former India captain Rahul Dravid, former Board of Control for Cricket in India Chairman N Srinivasan, Tamil Nadu Cricket Association President Rupa Gurunath and other officials.

See also 

 M. A. Chidhambaram Stadium

References 

Cricket grounds in Tamil Nadu
2020 establishments in Tamil Nadu
Sports venues completed in 2020
Sports venues in Salem, Tamil Nadu
Salem Spartans